This is a list of notable punk rock bands (letters L through Z). The bands listed have played some type of punk music at some point in their career, although they may have also played other styles. Bands who played in a style that influenced early punk rock—such as garage rock and protopunk—but never played punk rock themselves, should not be on this list. Bands who created a new genre that was influenced by (but is not a subgenre of) punk rock—such as alternative rock, crossover thrash, grunge, metalcore, New Wave, and post-punk—but never played punk rock, should not be listed either.

L

M

N

O

P

Q

R

S

T

U

V

W

X

Y

Z

 L